The 1940 Georgetown Hoyas football team represented Georgetown University during the 1940 college football season. The Hoyas were led by ninth-year head coach Jack Hagerty and played their home games at Griffith Stadium in Washington, D.C. The team carried into the year a two-year, 16-game unbeaten streak, which ended at 23 games after a tightly contested loss to eventual co-national champion Boston College. Georgetown ended the regular season with a record of 8–1, ranked 13th in the AP Poll, the only ranked finish in Hoyas team history. They were invited to the 1941 Orange Bowl, where they lost to Mississippi State, 7–14.

Schedule

References

Georgetown
Georgetown Hoyas football seasons
Georgetown Hoyas football